Morley is an unincorporated community and coal town in Campbell County, Tennessee.

References

Unincorporated communities in Campbell County, Tennessee
Unincorporated communities in Tennessee
Coal towns in Tennessee